Zhāng Yùtái (born September 1945) is a politician of the People's Republic of China. He currently serves as the director and leader of Party group of Development Research Center of the State Council of PRC.

Born in Tancheng County, Shandong, Zhang graduated from the department of computer science at the Beijing Institute of Aeronautics in 1968. He was then sent to work at a farm in the Shenyang Military Region. From 1970, he conducted research at the Institute of Semiconductors at the Chinese Academy of Sciences. In 1980, he began to serve in the National Commission of Science and Technology, and was the vice director of general office of the Commission. In 1985, he became the vice director of Science and Technology Leading Group Office of the State Council. From 1988, he served in Chinese Academy of Sciences, and was the vice secretary-general and director of associated office, president and editor-in-chief of the newspaper agency "Chinese Science". In January 1995, Zhang served in China Association of Science and Technology, and was the leader of Party group, vice president and the first secretary of the secretariat. In October 2004, Zhang was appointed as vice director and leader of Party group of Development Research Center of the State Council. Since June, 2007, Zhang has served as director and leader of Party group of the Center.

Zhang was a member of 16th Central Committee of the Communist Party of China, and is a current member of 17th Central Committee of CPC. He was also a standing committee member of 9th National People's Congress, and a member of law committee.

References

People's Republic of China politicians from Shandong
1945 births
Living people
Chinese Communist Party politicians from Shandong
Politicians from Linyi